On September 15, 2003 XGI Technology Inc introduced the Volari Duo V8 Ultra and the Volari Duo V5 Ultra.  These dual GPU graphics cards while impressive looking failed to compete with the single core GPU cards put out by NVIDIA and ATI and disappeared from the market.

References

XGI Volari Duo V8 Ultra 256MB Video Card Review
Club3D Volari Duo V8 Ultra Review
A New Graphics Kid on the Block: XGI Volari

External links
XGI Technology Inc
 XGI Volari Duo Graphic card

Graphics cards